Shaky Dream is the second studio album by Canadian band Dinosaur Bones. It was released in August 2013 under Dine Alone Records.

Track listing

References

2013 albums
Dine Alone Records albums